Pasquale "Pat" Caruso (born June 30, 1963 in Italy) is a former field hockey player.

Caruso participated in two consecutive Summer Olympics for Canada, starting in 1984. After having finished in tenth position in Los Angeles, California, the resident of Calgary, Alberta ended up in eleventh place with the Men's National Team in the Seoul Games.

International senior competitions

 1984 – Olympic Games, Los Angeles (10th)
 1988 – Olympic Games, Seoul (11th)

References

External links
 
 
 
 

1963 births
Living people
Canadian male field hockey players
Olympic field hockey players of Canada
Field hockey players at the 1984 Summer Olympics
Field hockey players at the 1988 Summer Olympics
Pan American Games gold medalists for Canada
Pan American Games silver medalists for Canada
Field hockey players at the 1987 Pan American Games
Field hockey players at the 1991 Pan American Games
Sportspeople from Calgary
Italian emigrants to Canada
Naturalized citizens of Canada
Pan American Games medalists in field hockey
1990 Men's Hockey World Cup players
Medalists at the 1987 Pan American Games
Medalists at the 1991 Pan American Games